Bruno Costa may refer to:

Bruno Costa (footballer, born 1986), Portuguese footballer
Bruno Costa (footballer, born 1997), Portuguese footballer
Bruno Costa de Souza (born 1990), Brazilian footballer
Bruno De Costa (born 1938), former Canadian sports shooter
Bruno Sarpa Costa (born 1984), Brazilian footballer
Bruno Tiago da Costa Araújo (born 1989), Brazilian footballer